The canton of Wissembourg is an administrative division of the Bas-Rhin department, northeastern France. Its borders were modified at the French canton reorganisation which came into effect in March 2015. Its seat is in Wissembourg.

It consists of the following communes:

Aschbach
Beinheim
Betschdorf
Buhl
Cleebourg
Climbach
Crœttwiller
Drachenbronn-Birlenbach
Eberbach-Seltz
Hatten
Hoffen
Hunspach
Ingolsheim
Keffenach
Kesseldorf
Lauterbourg
Memmelshoffen
Mothern
Munchhausen
Neewiller-près-Lauterbourg
Niederlauterbach
Niederrœdern
Oberhoffen-lès-Wissembourg
Oberlauterbach
Oberrœdern
Retschwiller
Riedseltz
Rittershoffen
Rott
Salmbach
Schaffhouse-près-Seltz
Scheibenhard
Schleithal
Schœnenbourg
Seebach
Seltz
Siegen
Soultz-sous-Forêts
Steinseltz
Stundwiller
Surbourg
Trimbach
Wintzenbach
Wissembourg

References

Cantons of Bas-Rhin